Vincent M. Ferrara, also known as "The Animal", (born 1949) is an Italian-American mobster from Boston, Massachusetts of the New England-based Patriarca crime family.

Criminal career
On March 22, 1990, Ferrara was indicted on racketeering and related charges with six other alleged members and an associate of the Patriarca Family. More specifically, Ferrara, Raymond J. Patriarca, J.R. Russo, Robert Carrozza, Dennis Lepore, Carmen Tortora, Pasquale Barone and Angelo Mercurio, who was, significantly, a fugitive, were charged with violating the Racketeer Influenced and Corrupt Organizations Act (RICO), by conspiring to participate in the affairs of a racketeering enterprise, and doing so, through a pattern of racketeering acts that included murder, extortion, and other crimes, some of which were also charged as separate substantive offenses. Three years later, under a plea agreement with the government just as his case was about to go to trial, he pleaded guilty to racketeering, extortion, gambling, and ordering the 1985 slaying of Boston mobster Vincent "Jimmy" Limoli. The murder was apparently the result of a narcotics transaction gone bad. Ferrara received a 22-year sentence.

Release from prison
After serving 16 years in prison, Ferrara was released on April 12, 2005. U.S. District Judge Mark L. Wolf ruled that several years were to be cut from Ferrara's sentence after finding that a prosecutor, Assistant United States Attorney Jeffrey Auerhahn, had withheld evidence during plea negotiations. Specifically, a key witness had tried to recant his claim that Ferrara had directed his codefendant Pasquale Barone to murder Vincent Limoli. Wolf concluded that Ferrara was denied due process and was probably innocent of Limoli's slaying, but pled guilty rather than risk a wrongful conviction. If Ferrara had been aware of the recantation, the judge decided, he may not have agreed to the deal that sent him to prison for 22 years. Ferrara, a father of five, was placed on supervised release for three years and prohibited from contact with any convicted felons during that time. Ferrara has stated that he will not return to his criminal past.

References

See also
Patriarca crime family

 

1949 births
American gangsters of Italian descent
People from North End, Boston
Patriarca crime family
Living people